Geza Gallos (7 September 1948 – 3 November 2013) was an Austrian footballer who played as a forward. Gallos played for Eisenstadt, Rapid Vienna, Linzer ASK, Admira Wacker and Neusiedl am See. He also won six caps for Austria.

References

External links
 
 

1948 births
2013 deaths
Austrian footballers
Austria international footballers
Association football forwards
Austrian Football Bundesliga players
SC Eisenstadt players
SK Rapid Wien players
LASK players
FC Admira Wacker Mödling players
SC Neusiedl 1919 players